Transition metal dithiocarbamate complexes are coordination complexes containing one or more dithiocarbamate ligand, which are typically abbreviated R2dtc−.  Many complexes are known. Several homoleptic derivatives have the formula M(R2dtc)n where n = 2 and 3.

Ligand characteristics

Dithiocarbamates are anions.  Because of the pi-donor properties of the amino substituent, the two sulfur centers show enhanced basicity.  This situation is represented by the zwitterionic resonance structure that depicts a positive charge on N and negative charges on both sulfurs.  This N to C pi-bonding results in partial double bond character.  Consequently, barriers to rotational about this bond are elevated.  Another consequence of their high basicity, dithiocarbamates often stabilize complexes in  uncharacteristically high oxidation state (e.g., Fe(IV), Co(IV), Ni(III), Cu(III)).

Dithiocarbamate salts are easily synthesized. Many primary and secondary amines react with carbon disulfide and sodium hydroxide to form dithiocarbamate salts:
R2NH  +  CS2  +  NaOH   →   R2NCS2−Na+  +  H2O

A wide variety of secondary amines give the corresponding dtc ligand.  Popular amines include dimethylamine (Me2NH), diethylamine (Et2NH), and pyrrolidine ((CH2)4NH).

Related ligands
Dithiocarbamates are classified as derivatives of dithiocarbamic acid.  Their properties as ligands resemble the conjugate bases of many related "1,1-dithioacids":
Xanthates, ROCS2−
Dithiophosphates, (RO)2PS2−
Dithiocarboxylates, RCS2−

Synthetic methods
Commonly, metal dithiocarbamates are prepared by salt metathesis reactions using alkali metal dithiocarbamates:
NiCl2  +  2NaS2CNMe2  →  Ni(S2CNMe2)2  +  2NaCl
A complementary  method entails oxidative addition of thiuram disulfides to low-valent metal complexes:
Mo(CO)6  +  2[S2CNMe2]2  →  Mo(S2CNMe2)4  +  6CO

Metal amido complexes, such as tetrakis(dimethylamido)titanium, react with carbon disulfide:
Ti(NMe2)4  +  4CS2  →  Ti(S2CNMe2)4

Homoleptic complexes

Bis complexes
 nickel bis(dimethyldithiocarbamate), palladium bis(dimethyldithiocarbamate), platinum bis(dimethyldithiocarbamate), all square-planar complexes
 copper bis(diethyldithiocarbamate), a square-planar complex

Tris complexes
 vanadium tris(diethyldithiocarbamate), an octahedral complex
 chromium tris(diethylditiocarbamate), an octahedral complex
 manganese tris(dimthylthtiocarbamate), an octahedral complex
 iron tris(diethyldithiocarbamate), ruthenium tris(diethyldithiocarbamate), osmium tris(diethyldithiocarbamate), all octahedral complexes
 cobalt tris(diethyldithiocarbamate), rhodium tris(diethyldithiocarbamate), iridium tris(diethyldithiocarbamate), all octahedral complexes

Tetrakis complexes
 titanium tetrakis(dimethyldithiocarbamate)
 molybdenum tetrakis(diethyldithiocarbamate)

Dimetallic complexes
 iron bis(diethyldithiocarbamate), pentacoordinate Fe dimer
 zinc bis(dimethyldithiocarbamate), pentacoordinate Zn dimer
 dicobalt pentakis(diethyldithiocarbamate) cation, with a pair of octahedral Co(III) centers
 diruthenium pentakis(diethyldithiocarbamate) cation, with a pair of octahedral Ru(III) centers, two isomers

Reactions
Dithiocarbamate complexes do not undergo characteristic reactions.  They can be removed from complexes by oxidation, as illustrated by the iodination of the iron tris(diethyldithiocarbamate):

They degrade to metal sulfides upon heating.

Applications
Dtc complexes find several applications:
 herbicides in the form of the iron and zinc derivatives Ferbam and Zineb, respectively
 vulcanization accelerators, zinc bis(dimethyldithiocarbamate)
 medicine, iron tris(dimethyldithiocarbamate) as a nitric oxide scavenger.

References

Dithiocarbamates